The Tragic Fantasy - Tiger of Wanchai is a 1994 Hong Kong action crime thriller film directed by Stephen Lo and Joe Chu and starring Simon Yam, Lau Ching-wan, Wan Yeung-ming and Roy Cheung. The film is based on the life of Sun Yee On triad member Andely Chan (portrayed in the film by Yam), nicknamed the "Tiger of Wan Chai", who was murdered in Macau in November 1993.

Plot
Chan Yiu-hing (Simon Yam) possess adept driving skills and works as a car jockey alongside his friends Hung (Wan Yeung-ming), Chung (Roy Cheung) and Dee (Lau Ching-wan). Because Dee was a compulsive gambler, he owed a large amount of gambling debt to Lam Kwok-yeung (Ben Lam), a triad leader of the Wan Chai district and was badly beaten by Lam. In order to pay for Dee's debt, Hing and his friends steal Lam's car and has thus forged a rivalry. On the other hand, Hing becomes obsessed with a girl named Miu (Mariane Chan), whom he had only met once. When the two meet again, they become a couple, while Hung also becomes a couple with Miu's friend Fanny (Charine Chan). Hing feels that his strength is weak and becomes involved in the debt collection field, where his influence becomes stronger. However, glory does not last long as many triad leaders were unhappy with Hing expanding his business and lures Hing into the drug business, which Hing refuses. When Hing goes to Macau to participate an auto race, the footsteps of assassins approach step by step closer.

Cast
Simon Yam as Chan Yiu-hing
Lau Ching-wan as Dee
Wan Yeung-ming as Hung
Roy Cheung as Chung
Charine Chan as Fanny
Mariane Chan as Miu
Yvonne Yung as Kitty
Chik King-man as Mandy
Ben Lam as Lam Kwok-yeung
William Ho as Uncle Bill
Lo Lieh as Uncle Kui
Ku Feng as Uncle Kau
Victor Hon as Sing
Johnny Tang as Race car driver in opening
Jack Wong as Uncle Bill's thug who forces Kitty to drink
Jameson Lam as Lam Kwok-yeung's thug
Johnny Cheung as Lam Kwok-yeung's thug
Fong Yue as Fanny's mother
Wong Yung as Noisy karaoke bar patron
Kwan Yung as Uncle Bill's thug
Hoh Wah
Ho Chi-moon
Lam Kwok-kit
John Cheung
Leo Tsang
Yu Ming-hin
Woo Pin-yue
Law Wai-kai
Christoper Chan as Thug
Tony Tam as Thug
So Wai-nam as Thug
Chu Tat-kwong as Thug
Cheung Siu as Party guest
Benny Lai as Man in shootout
Wu Zhan-peng as Man in shootout
Jacky Cheung Chun-hung as Thug	 
Lui Siu-ming

Reception

Critical
Love HK Film gave the film a mixed review praising Simon Yam's performance and the story as "sporadically entertaining, but also overdirected to the point of distraction."

Box office
The film grossed HK$11,067,166 at the Hong Kong box office during its theatrical run from 19 August to 16 September 1994.

References

External links

The Tragic Fantasy - Tiger of Wanchai at Hong Kong Cinemagic

1994 films
1994 action thriller films
1994 crime thriller films
Hong Kong action thriller films
Hong Kong crime thriller films
Triad films
Hong Kong auto racing films
1990s Cantonese-language films
Thriller films based on actual events
Films set in Hong Kong
Films shot in Hong Kong
Regal Entertainment films
1994 directorial debut films
1990s Hong Kong films